Sir Purniah Narasinga Rao Krishnamurti, KCIE (12 August 1849 – 1911) was an Indian lawyer and administrator who served as the 16th Diwan of Mysore from 1901 to 1906. He was a direct descendant of Diwan Purnaiah, the first Dewan of Mysore.

Early life and education
Krishnamurti was born on 12 August 1849 in the Mysore kingdom and was educated at Bangalore. He graduated in law from the University of Madras and joined Mysore Civil Service as Assistant Superintendent in 1870 during Mysore Commission. After the restoration of the throne to the Wadiyar dynasty, Krishnamurti served as a judge of the Chief Court before being appointed Diwan in 1901. On 3 August 1905, whilst he was Dewan, electric lighting was introduced in Bangalore, becoming the first city in India to get electric street lighting. He was also the fifth Jagirdar of Yelandur estate.

He had two children, one of whom survived to adulthood.

Awards and honours
In 1897, Krishnamurti was made a Companion of the Order of the Indian Empire (CIE). He was promoted to Knight Commander of the Order of the Indian Empire in the 1903 Durbar Honours.

Places in honour 
Krishnamurthypuram, a locality in Mysore, is named after him.

Descendants
Krishnamurti's great grandchildren include Vatsala Rao, Sadanand Baily, Vimala Srinivas, Sona Rao, Venkat Rao, Parimala Rao, Surekha Raghavendran, and Chandrika Pradeep. His great great grandchildren include Manjunath, Ananth Dodabalapur, Supriya Baily, Sudarshan Baily, Anita Kashyap, Anjali Bettadapur, Pramod Venkat Rao, Pramita, Prassana Venkat Rao, CR Arvind, and Dhatri Pradeep.

References

Knights Commander of the Order of the Indian Empire
Indian knights
1849 births
1911 deaths
Diwans of Mysore
Madhva Brahmins